Live Era '87–'93 is a double live album by the American hard rock band Guns N' Roses. It was released on November 23, 1999. The record was the first official Guns N' Roses release since "The Spaghetti Incident?" released on the same day in 1993. Guitarist Slash notes that the album is "not pretty and there are a lot of mistakes, but this is Guns N' Roses, not the fucking Mahavishnu Orchestra. It's as honest as it gets."

The album is certified gold by the RIAA for shipments of 500,000 copies. The RIAA counts each disc in a double album separately for certification, so the album has actually shipped 250,000 copies.

Album information
The album was compiled by band associate Del James. The dates and locations of the tracks are not revealed in the liner notes, and are referred to simply as being "Recorded across the universe between 1987 and 1993". However, the majority are believed to be from the Use Your Illusion Tour of 1991-1993.

Axl Rose is alleged to have communicated through intermediaries with former Guns N' Roses members Slash and Duff McKagan to select the track list. "The live album was one of the easiest projects we all worked on," Slash noted. "I didn't actually see Axl, but we communicated via the powers that be."

Matt Sorum and Gilby Clarke, who play on the majority of the tracks, are not credited as band members, but as "additional musicians". Classic-member drummer Steven Adler, who plays on only three tracks, and Izzy Stradlin, who plays on six, are credited as "main band members."

Two popular live songs, "Live and Let Die" and "Civil War" – both played frequently during the Use Your Illusion Tour – are omitted from this release. Songs that were played to a much lesser extent ("Pretty Tied Up" and "Move to the City") are included.

The Japanese and vinyl versions of the album contain a rare performance of "Coma".

"Knockin' on Heaven's Door" was performed and recorded at the Freddie Mercury Tribute Concert and was previously released on the "Knockin' on Heaven's Door" single.

"Estranged," "Don't Cry," "November Rain," "Pretty Tied Up", "You Could Be Mine" and "Move To The City" were previously released on the band's Use Your Illusion I and Use Your Illusion II videos. The live audio from "Yesterdays" was included as a B-side on that song's CD single.

Two similar covers were released, with the slight difference being either a blue corner or a red corner. The blue corner was the explicit release and the red corner was the clean release.

Track listing
All music and lyrics written by Guns N' Roses, except where noted

A live version of "Coma" was released on several versions.

Personnel
Credits are adapted from the album's liner notes.

Band members
W. Axl Rose – lead vocals, piano on "It's Alright" and "November Rain", whistling on "Patience", whistle on "Paradise City", backing vocals on "Dust N' Bones"
Slash – lead guitar, rhythm guitar, acoustic guitar on Patience, talkbox on "Dust N' Bones" and "Rocket Queen", backing vocals
Izzy Stradlin – rhythm guitar, backing vocals, lead vocals on "Dust N' Bones" (1987–1991)
Duff McKagan – bass, acoustic guitar on Patience, backing vocals
Steven Adler – drums (1987–1988)
Dizzy Reed – keyboards, piano, synthesizer, percussion, backing vocals (1991–1993)
Matt Sorum – drums, backing vocals (1991–1993)
Gilby Clarke – rhythm guitar, co-lead guitar on "Nightrain", acoustic guitar on "Patience", backing vocals (1992–1993)

Backing musicians
Teddy Andreadis – backing vocals, harmonica, percussion, keyboards (1992)
Roberta Freeman – backing vocals (1992)
Tracey Amos – backing vocals (1992)
Cece Worrall – horns (1992)
Anne King – horns (1992)
Lisa Maxwell – horns (1992)

Charts
The album reached number 45 in the UK albums chart.

Certifications

See also
List of glam metal albums and songs

References

External links
 GNR On Tour's Live Era Source Listing - John M.'s concert source listing for the album.
 Live Era '01-'07 - A Fanmade Compilation   entitled Live Era '01-'07

Guns N' Roses live albums
1999 live albums
Geffen Records live albums